The Computer University, Monywa is a public university in Monywa, Sagaing Region, Myanmar. The Ministry of Science and Technology run university offers bachelor's, and graduate degree programs in computer science, and computer technology. Students may continue advanced studies at the University of Computer Studies, Yangon in Yangon.

History
The university was founded as the Government Computer College, Monywa in the city of Monywa in September 2000. The college was moved to the present  location at Monhuyin Saigyidaw village on the outskirts of the city a year later. In April 2006, a new building was opened. In January 2007, the college was "upgraded" to the university level. The university is part of a number of formerly two-year schools that have been promoted to university level in recent years. The military government, which repeatedly closed down schools and universities in the 1990s, has pursued a policy of dispersing students away from major city centers.

Programs
CU, Monywa offers 5-year bachelor's, and two-year master's degree programs in computer science and computer technology.

See also
 University of Computer Studies, Mandalay
 University of Computer Studies, Yangon

References

Universities and colleges in Monywa
Universities and colleges in Sagaing Region
Technological universities in Myanmar